The American Football Women's League (AFWL) which debuted on May 15, 2002, was  one of the first women's football leagues formed, originally using the name WAFL, or Women's American Football League in 2001. The  AFWL officially disbanded in March 2003, due to money and attendance problems.

AFWL teams
Arizona Titans
Long Beach Aftershock
Los Angeles Lasers
Sacramento Gold Rush ?
San Diego Sunfire
San Francisco Tsunami

AFWL Championships

See also
Women's Professional Football League (WPFL)
Women's Football in the United States
List of leagues of American football

Defunct American football leagues in the United States
Sports leagues established in 2002
Sports leagues disestablished in 2003
Women's American football leagues
2002 establishments in the United States